Archibald Charles Manning (born May 19, 2005) is an American college quarterback. He is a member of the Manning family.

High school career
In his freshman year, Manning was the varsity starter at quarterback, the first freshman quarterback to start Newman's season opener in at least 40 years. He shined in his debut, leading Newman to a 26-point victory. Manning completed his freshman season with 2,407 yards and 34 touchdowns, earning MaxPreps National Freshman of the Year honors.

Manning opened his sophomore season by throwing for six touchdowns against David Guillot's defense at East Jefferson High School. On October 15, 2020, he made his national television debut in a game against Booker T. Washington, throwing for two touchdowns and rushing for two more.

To avoid a media frenzy, Manning's family has withheld him from media interviews and also declined premature college scholarship offers. He ran a private account on Instagram, allowing only friends and coaches to follow him, including Ole Miss head coach Lane Kiffin. "They've shut down everything," said one member of the local media, "but the attention is going to come." In his college search he visited SMU, Clemson, LSU, Alabama, Texas, Georgia, and Virginia, as well as Ole Miss, his grandfather's, father's, and uncle's former team. He made his account public on June 23, 2022, when he committed to Texas.

|}

Personal life
A member of the Manning family, he is the oldest son of Cooper, a grandson of Archie, and a nephew of Peyton and Eli.

References

Living people
American football quarterbacks
Year of birth uncertain
Isidore Newman School alumni
Arch
Players of American football from New Orleans
2005 births